W.A.K.O. European Championships 1979 was the third European kickboxing championships hosted by the W.A.K.O. organization, organized by the Italian Ennio Falsoni.  As with previous European championships the 1979 W.A.K.O. championships were open to amateur men based in Europe only, with each country allowed more than one competitor in an individual weight category.  Two styles of kickboxing were on offer – Full-Contact and Semi-Contact.  By the championships end West Germany was yet again the strongest nation, with Yugoslavia in second place, and hosts Italy in third - more detail on the winners and medal tables can be found in the sections below.  The event was held in 1979 in Milan, Italy.

Men's Full-Contact Kickboxing

At Milan the men's Full-Contact kickboxing category had seven weight divisions ranging from 57 kg/125.4 lbs to over 84 kg/+184.8 lbs, with all bouts fought under Full-Contact rules.  More detail on Full-Contact's rules-set can be found at the W.A.K.O. website, although be aware that the rules have changed since 1979.  The medal winners of each division are shown below with Peter Harbrecht winning yet another gold and future K-1 world champion Branko Cikatić winning his first major title.  Also of interest were Jerome and Jonny Canabate who had won medals at previous W.A.K.O. championships representing Switzerland, but were now picking up medals for the host nation Italy.  At the end of the championships West Germany were the strongest nation in the Full-Contact category winning four gold, one silver and one bronze medal.

Men's Full-Contact Kickboxing Medals Table

Men's Semi-Contact Kickboxing

Absent from the 1978 world championship, Semi-Contact returned to the Milan European championships.  Unlike Full-Contact where fighters could be knocked out, Semi-Contact relied on contestants to outscore the other using skill, speed and technique to score points rather than by using excessive force - more detail on Semi-Contact can be found on the W.A.K.O. website, although the rules will have changed somewhat since 1979.  As with Full-Contact there were seven weight divisions ranging from 57 kg/125.4 lbs to over 84 kg/+184.8 lbs.  The medal winners of each division are shown below with West Germany again being the strongest nation with five gold medals and two silvers won in Semi-Contact by the end of the championships.

Men's Semi-Contact Kickboxing Medals Table

Overall Medals Standing (Top 5)

See also
List of WAKO Amateur European Championships
List of WAKO Amateur World Championships

References

External links
 WAKO World Association of Kickboxing Organizations Official Site

WAKO Amateur European Championships events
Kickboxing in Italy
1979 in kickboxing
Sports competitions in Milan
1979 in Italian sport